Hawi Feysa (born 1 February 1999) is an Ethiopian track and field athlete who specializes in long-distance running. 

At the 2017 IAAF World Cross Country Championships, she won the silver medal in the Junior women's race, finishing behind Letesenbet Gidey.

Feysa placed fourth in the women's 5000 metres at the 2018 African Championships in Athletics. 

In June 2019, she was runner-up to Caster Semenya in the 2000m at the Meeting de Montreuil, achieving a new personal best of 5:38.66.

In 2019, she competed in the senior women's race at the 2019 IAAF World Cross Country Championships held in Aarhus, Denmark. She finished in 17th place.

At the 2019 African Games held in Rabat, Morocco, she won the silver medal in the women's 5000 metres.

She represented Ethiopia at the 2019 World Athletics Championships, competing in the women's 5000 metres.

References

External links

Ethiopian female long-distance runners
1999 births
Living people
World Athletics Championships athletes for Ethiopia
Athletes (track and field) at the 2019 African Games
African Games medalists in athletics (track and field)
African Games silver medalists for Ethiopia
20th-century Ethiopian women
21st-century Ethiopian women